C. ehrenbergi may refer to:

 Carcharias ehrenbergi, a requiem shark
 Crenella ehrenbergi, a bean mussel

See also

 C. ehrenbergii (disambiguation)